Corpeau is a commune in the Côte-d'Or department in Bourgogne-Franche-Comté, eastern France. Neighboring towns include Puligny Montrachet to the north, Ebaty to the east, Chagny to the south and Chassagne-Montrachet to the west.

Population

List of mayors

See also
Communes of the Côte-d'Or department

References

Communes of Côte-d'Or
Côte-d'Or communes articles needing translation from French Wikipedia